Hoplandrothrips(commonly misspelled as Hoplandothrips) is a genus of thrips in the Phlaeothripidae family. Some species are recorded as pests on coffee growing in East Africa, causing a distinctive rolling of the leaf. The genus was first described in 1912 by J. Douglas Hood.

Description
Adults are dark brown and around 2 mm long and the larvae are pale yellow. In coffee, they feed on young leaves causing them to roll very tightly, reducing the photosynthetic area of the leaf. They tend to cause little loss in yield however compared to coffee berry borer and antestia bugs.

Species

 Hoplandrothrips abrasi
 Hoplandrothrips acaciae
 Hoplandrothrips affinis
 Hoplandrothrips albipes
 Hoplandrothrips angulosus
 Hoplandrothrips angustatus
 Hoplandrothrips approximatus
 Hoplandrothrips armiger
 Hoplandrothrips arrhenus
 Hoplandrothrips bartlei
 Hoplandrothrips bellicosus
 Hoplandrothrips bidens Bagnall, 1910
 Hoplandrothrips bournieri
 Hoplandrothrips brasiliensis
 Hoplandrothrips bredoi Praisner - a minor pest of coffee in the Democratic Republic of Congo
 Hoplandrothrips brunneicinctus
 Hoplandrothrips brunneicornis
 Hoplandrothrips casamancae
 Hoplandrothrips caudatus
 Hoplandrothrips chapmani
 Hoplandrothrips choritus Mound & Walker, 1986
 Hoplandrothrips coffeae Bagnall - a minor pest of coffee in western Tanzania
 Hoplandrothrips coloratus
 Hoplandrothrips consobrinus
 Hoplandrothrips cooperi
 Hoplandrothrips coorongi
 Hoplandrothrips corticis
 Hoplandrothrips costano
 Hoplandrothrips cubicola
 Hoplandrothrips edentatus
 Hoplandrothrips ellisi
 Hoplandrothrips elongatus
 Hoplandrothrips erythrinae
 Hoplandrothrips esakii
 Hoplandrothrips famelicus
 Hoplandrothrips fasciatus
 Hoplandrothrips flavidus
 Hoplandrothrips flavipes
 Hoplandrothrips forbesi
 Hoplandrothrips fusciflavus
 Hoplandrothrips fuscus
 Hoplandrothrips gloriosi
 Hoplandrothrips gynandrus
 Hoplandrothrips hemiflavus
 Hoplandrothrips hesperidum
 Hoplandrothrips honestus
 Hoplandrothrips hoodi
 Hoplandrothrips horridus
 Hoplandrothrips howei
 Hoplandrothrips huastecus
 Hoplandrothrips hungaricus
 Hoplandrothrips hylaius
 Hoplandrothrips hystrix
 Hoplandrothrips ibisci
 Hoplandrothrips ingenuus Mound & Walker, 1986
 Hoplandrothrips insolens
 Hoplandrothrips irretius
 Hoplandrothrips jasmini
 Hoplandrothrips jennei
 Hoplandrothrips jennyae
 Hoplandrothrips juniperinus
 Hoplandrothrips kudoi
 Hoplandrothrips landolphiae
 Hoplandrothrips leai
 Hoplandrothrips lepidus
 Hoplandrothrips lissonotus
 Hoplandrothrips longirostris
 Hoplandrothrips maderensis
 Hoplandrothrips marshalli Karny - a moderate pest of coffee in the Democratic Republic of Congo and Uganda.
 Hoplandrothrips mcateei
 Hoplandrothrips microps
 Hoplandrothrips nasutus
 Hoplandrothrips neovulcaniensis
 Hoplandrothrips nigricestus Hood, 1934 
 Hoplandrothrips nipponicus
 Hoplandrothrips nobilis
 Hoplandrothrips nonakai
 Hoplandrothrips obesametae
 Hoplandrothrips ochraceus
 Hoplandrothrips olmecanus
 Hoplandrothrips ommatus
 Hoplandrothrips oreillyi
 Hoplandrothrips orientalis
 Hoplandrothrips pallens
 Hoplandrothrips palmerae
 Hoplandrothrips parvus
 Hoplandrothrips pergandei
 Hoplandrothrips picticornis
 Hoplandrothrips priesneri
 Hoplandrothrips proteus
 Hoplandrothrips quadriconus
 Hoplandrothrips quercuspumilae
 Hoplandrothrips raptor
 Hoplandrothrips russelli
 Hoplandrothrips rusticus
 Hoplandrothrips ryukyuensis
 Hoplandrothrips salicacearum
 Hoplandrothrips schoutedeni
 Hoplandrothrips scutellaris
 Hoplandrothrips sides
 Hoplandrothrips symmetricus
 Hoplandrothrips tarascus
 Hoplandrothrips tareei
 Hoplandrothrips tristissimus
 Hoplandrothrips trucatoapicus
 Hoplandrothrips trybomi
 Hoplandrothrips tumiceps
 Hoplandrothrips ugandensis
 Hoplandrothrips uzeli
 Hoplandrothrips vansoni
 Hoplandrothrips variegatus
 Hoplandrothrips vazquezae
 Hoplandrothrips vernus Mound & Walker, 1986
 Hoplandrothrips virago
 Hoplandrothrips williamsianus
 Hoplandrothrips xanthocnemis
 Hoplandrothrips xanthopoides Bagnall, 1917

References

Thrips genera
Phlaeothripidae
Insects of Africa
Taxa described in 1912
Taxa named by Joseph Douglas Hood